Dessa is an American singer, rapper, and writer.

Dessa may also refer to:

Dessa (artist), a Swiss visual artist
Dessa, a fictitious planet, dying from an ecological catastrophe, from the Soviet film Per Aspera Ad Astra
Dessa, Niger, a village and rural commune in Niger
Dessa (Filipina singer), a Filipino singer
Dessa Rose, a novel by Sherley Anne Williams
Dessa Rose (musical), a musical based on the novel